The Vijayanagara Empire from 1336–1646, was situated in Southern India and had a complex currency system that was used after the Empire ceased to exist.

The standard unit of coin issued by the Vijayanagara Empire was the gold Pagoda in English or Varaha of 3.4 gr. The Varaha was also called the Hon, Gadyana or a Pon and came in the Ghattivaraha, Doddavaraha and Suddhavaraha coin. In the gold issue the different coins came in Varaha, this is used as a reference for the other coins values. 1 gold Varaha = 2 Pratapas = 4 Katis = 8 Chinna = 4 Haga = 2 Bele. 1 Pana or Varaha equaled 16 tara silver coins, with the 1 Tara to 3 copper Jital. The copper Duggani was equal to 2 copper kani or kakin, 5 Kasu and 10 Ara Kasu There were also other units of silver and copper based on their relationship with the Pagodagold.

Several gold ramatankas (token coins), feature the scene of God Vishnu's incoronation, were also issued in the Vijayanagara Empire. These coins are now used as objects of worship in the modern Indian homes.

References

External links
VIJAYANAGARA, THE FORGOTTEN EMPIRE
Vijayanagara Coinage
A website on Vijayanagara coinage by Oruganti Harihariah.
Coins Issued By Vijayanagara Rulers
Coins of Vijayanagar

Coins by country
Coins of India
Medieval currencies
Vijayanagara Empire
Historical currencies of India
Economic history of Karnataka